The skeleton of a cuboctahedron, considering its edges as rigid beams connected at flexible joints at its vertices but omitting its faces, does not have structural rigidity and consequently its vertices can be repositioned by folding (changing the dihedral angle) at edges and face diagonals. The cuboctahedron's kinematics is noteworthy in that its vertices can be repositioned to the vertex positions of the regular icosahedron, the Jessen's icosahedron, and the regular octahedron, in accordance with the pyritohedral symmetry of the icosahedron.

Rigid and kinematic cuboctahedra
When interpreted as a framework of rigid flat faces, connected along the edges by hinges, the cuboctahedron is a rigid structure, as are all convex polyhedra, by Cauchy's theorem. However, when the faces are removed, leaving only rigid edges connected by flexible joints at the vertices, the result is not a rigid system (unlike polyhedra whose faces are all triangles, to which Cauchy's theorem applies despite the missing faces).

Adding a central vertex, connected by rigid edges to all the other vertices, subdivides the cuboctahedron into square pyramids and tetrahedra, meeting at the central vertex. Unlike the cuboctahedron itself, the resulting system of edges and joints is rigid, and forms part of the infinite octet truss structure.

Cyclical cuboctahedron transformations

The cuboctahedron can be transformed cyclically through four polyhedra, repeating the cycle endlessly. Topologically the transformation follows a Möbius loop: it is an orientable double cover of the octahedron.

In their spatial relationships the cuboctahedron, icosahedron, Jessen's icosahedron, and octahedron nest like Russian dolls and are related by a helical contraction. The contraction begins with the square faces of the cuboctahedron folding inward along their diagonals to form pairs of triangles. The 12 vertices of the cuboctahedron spiral inward (toward the center) and move closer together until they reach the points where they form a regular icosahedron; they move slightly closer together until they form a Jessen's icosahedron; and they continue to spiral toward each other until they coincide in pairs as the 6 vertices of the octahedron.

The general cuboctahedron transformation can be parameterized along a continuum of special-case transformations with two limit-cases: one in which the edges of the cuboctahedron are rigid, and one in which they are elastic.

Rigid-edge transformation

The rigid-edge cuboctahedron transformation symmetrically transforms the cuboctahedron into a regular icosahedron, a Jessen's icosahedron, and a regular octahedron, in the sense that the polyhedron's vertices take on the vertex positions of those polyhedra successively. 

The cuboctahedron does not actually become those other polyhedra, and they cannot transform into each other (if they have rigid edges), because unlike the cuboctahedron they do have structural rigidity as a consequence of having only triangular faces.

What the cuboctahedron with rigid edges actually can transform into (and through) is a regular icosahedron from which 6 edges are missing (a pseudoicosahedron), a Jessen's icosahedron in which the 6 reflex edges are missing or elastic, and a double cover of the octahedron that has two coincident rigid edges connecting each pair of vertices (formed by making pairs of cuboctahedron vertices coincide).

Elastic-edge transformation
There is a tensegrity polyhedron which embodies and enforces the closely related elastic-edge cuboctahedron transformation. The tensegrity icosahedron has a dynamic structural rigidity called infinitesimal mobility and can only be deformed into symmetrical polyhedra along that spectrum from cuboctahedron to octahedron. It is called the tensegrity icosahedron because its median stable form is the Jessen's icosahedron.

Although the transformation is described above as a contraction of the cuboctahedron, the stable equilibrium point of the tensegrity is the Jessen's icosahedron; the tensegrity icosahedron resists being deformed from that shape and can only be forced to expand or contract from it to the extent that its edges are elastic (able to lengthen under tension). Forcing the polyhedron away from its stable resting shape (in either direction) involves stretching its 24 short edges slightly and equally. Force applied to any pair of parallel long edges, to move them closer together or farther apart, is transferred automatically to stretch all the short edges uniformly, shrinking the polyhedron from its medium-size Jessen's icosahedron toward the smaller octahedron, or expanding it toward the larger regular icosahedron and still larger cuboctahedron, respectively. Releasing the force causes the polyhedron to spring back to its Jessen's icosahedron resting shape.

In the elastic-edge transformation the cuboctahedron edges are not rigid (though the Jessen's icosahedron's 6 long edges are). What the cuboctahedron actually transforms into is a regular icosahedron of shorter radius and shorter edge length, a Jessen's icosahedron of still shorter radius and (minimum) edge length, and finally an octahedron of still shorter radius but the same (maximum) edge length as the cuboctahedron (but only after the edges have shortened and lengthened again, and come together in coincident pairs).

Duality of the rigid-edge and elastic-edge transformations
The rigid-edge and elastic-edge cuboctahedron transformations differ only in having reciprocal parameters: in the elastic-edge transformation the Jessen's icosahedron's short edges stretch and its long edges are rigid, and in the rigid-edge transformation its long edges compress and its short edges are rigid. Everything in the descriptions above except the metrics applies to all cuboctahedron transformations. In particular, the vertices always move in helices toward the center as the cuboctahedron transforms into the octahedron, and the Jessen's icosahedron (with 90° dihedral angles) is always the median point, stable to the extent that there is resistance to the stretching or compressing.

The elastic-edge cuboctahedron transformation is usually given as the mathematics of the tensegrity icosahedron because it comes closest to modeling how most actual tensegrity icosahedron structures behave. However, one could certainly construct a tensegrity icosahedron in which the short edges (cables) were perfectly inelastic, and the long edges (struts) were compressable springs. Such a tensegrity would perform the rigid-edge cuboctahedron transformation.

Finally, both transformations are pure abstractions, the two limit cases of an infinite family of cuboctahedron transformations in which there are two elasticity parameters and no requirement that one of them be 0. Neither limit case is apt to apply perfectly to most real tensegrity structures, which usually have some elasticity in both the cables and the struts, giving their actual behavior metrics which are non-trivial to calculate. In engineering practice, only a tiny amount of elasticity is required to allow a significant degree of motion, so most tensegrity structures are constructed to be "drum-tight" using nearly inelastic struts and cables. A tensegrity icosahedron transformation is a kinematic cuboctahedron transformation with reciprocal small elasticity parameters.

Jitterbug transformations
The twisting, expansive-contractive transformations between these polyhedra were named Jitterbug transformations by Buckminster Fuller. Fuller did not give any mathematics; like many great geometers before him (Alicia Boole Stott for example) he did not have any mathematics to give. But he was the first to stress the importance of the cuboctahedron's radial equilateral symmetry which he applied structurally (and patented) as the octet truss, intuiting that it plays a fundamental role not only in structural integrity but in the dimensional relationships between polytopes. He discovered the kinematic transformation of the cuboctahedron, understood its relationship to the tensegrity icosahedron, and even gave demonstrations of the rigid-edge cuboctahedron transformation before audiences (in the days before computer-rendered animations). His demonstration with commentary of the "vector equilibrium", as he called the cuboctahedron, is still far more illuminating than the animations in this article.

Notes

References

Bibliography

 
 
 
 
 ; see the video itself at "The Borromean Rings: A new logo for the IMU", International Mathematical Union

External links
 

Archimedean solids
Quasiregular polyhedra
Tensile architecture